Sir Nicholas Poyntz (1510—circa 28 November 1556) was a prominent English courtier during the latter part of Henry VIII's reign. There is a portrait drawing by Hans Holbein the Younger in the Royal Collection and an oil portrait after the same artist based on the drawing in the National Portrait Gallery, London. One further portrait also exists after Holbein.

Life
He was the eldest son of Sir Anthony Poyntz (1480?–1533), vice-admiral, and his first wife Elizabeth Huddefield. His uncle was John Poyntz.

On Saturday 21 August 1535, Henry VIII and Anne Boleyn visited Nicholas Poyntz at Acton Court, Iron Acton, Gloucestershire. Poyntz had built a special new lodging for his royal guests which still survives. It contained three first-floor state rooms and one of these still has painted decorations by an artist of the Tudor court. These staterooms connected to the older house by a covered walkway called a 'pentice.' Archaeological excavations found fragments of precious Venetian glass and maiolica which Nicholas probably bought for the visit. The evidence of lengthy preparations by Nicholas at Acton shows that Henry's progress in the west of England was planned in advance.

In 1539 and 1545 he served as High Sheriff of Gloucestershire and in 1547 represented Gloucestershire in Parliament as a Knight of the Shire.

Between 1544 and 1556 Poyntz built as a hunting lodge Newark Park, near the village of Ozleworth, Wotton-under-Edge, Gloucestershire. This was built at about the same time as nearby Siston Court was being built by Sir Maurice Denys (d.1563), first cousin of Poyntz's wife Jane Berkeley. He was elected MP for Cricklade in 1555.

During the war of the Rough Wooing with Scotland (1543–1550), Poyntz commanded the warship the Great Galley. In May 1544, the Earl of Hertford sent him to burn Kinghorn and other towns in Fife, while Edinburgh was sacked and burnt.

He had married Joan, daughter of Thomas Berkeley, 5th Baron Berkeley (d.1533). with whom he had five or six sons and three daughters. He was succeeded by his eldest son, Nicholas. After his death his widow made a disastrous second marriage to Sir Thomas Dyer, who treated her cruelly. She died in 1564.

References

Attribution

External links

 Acton Court, built by Nicholas Poyntz in 1535
  www.tudorplace.com Poyntz pedigree

1510 births
1557 deaths
English people of the Rough Wooing
High Sheriffs of Gloucestershire
English MPs 1547–1552
English MPs 1555
Politicians from Gloucestershire
Members of Parliament for Cricklade